Bertilsson is a surname and may refer to:

Carl Bertilsson (1889–1968), Swedish gymnast who competed in the 1908 Summer Olympics
Henrik Bertilsson (born 1969), retired Swedish professional football forward
Johan Bertilsson (born 1988), Swedish footballer
Marcus Bertilsson (born 1986), Swedish guitar player
Per Bertilsson (1892–1972), Swedish gymnast who competed in the 1912 Summer Olympics
Simon Bertilsson (born 1991), Swedish ice hockey player
Stig Bertilsson, (born 1950), Swedish politician and entrepreneur, member of the Swedish parliament 1987–1996

See also
Bert Nilsson

Swedish-language surnames